Natallia Aliakseyeuna Sakharuk (Belarusian: Наталля Аляксееўна Сахарук; Russian: Наталья Алексеевна Сахарук; born on 27 July 1973), is a Belarusian former synchronized swimmer. She had competed at the 2000 Summer Olympics in Sydney.

References

1973 births
Living people
Belarusian synchronized swimmers
Olympic synchronized swimmers of Belarus
Synchronized swimmers at the 2000 Summer Olympics